An order of magnitude of time is usually a decimal prefix or decimal order-of-magnitude quantity together with a base unit of time, like a microsecond or a million years. In some cases, the order of magnitude may be implied (usually 1), like a "second" or "year". In other cases, the quantity name implies the base unit, like "century". In most cases, the base unit is seconds or years. 

Prefixes are not usually used with a base unit of years. Therefore, it is said "a million years" instead of "a mega year". Clock time and calendar time have duodecimal or sexagesimal orders of magnitude rather than decimal, e.g., a year is 12 months, and a minute is 60 seconds.

The smallest meaningful increment of time is the Planck time―the time light takes to traverse the Planck distance, many decimal orders of magnitude smaller than a second.

The largest realized amount of time, based on known scientific data, is the age of the universe, about 13.8 billion years—the time since the Big Bang as measured in the cosmic microwave background rest frame. Those amounts of time together span 60 decimal orders of magnitude.

Metric units of time larger than the second are most commonly seen only in a few scientific contexts such as observational astronomy and materials science, although this depends on the author. For everyday use and most other scientific contexts, the common units of minutes, hours (3,600 s or 3.6 ks), days (86,400 s), weeks, months, and years (of which there are a number of variations) are commonly used. Weeks, months, and years are significantly variable units whose length depend on the choice of calendar and are often not regular even with a calendar, e.g., leap years versus regular years in the Gregorian calendar. This makes them problematic for use against a linear and regular time scale such as that defined by the SI, since it is not clear which version is being used. 

Because of this, the table below does not include weeks, months, and years. Instead, the table uses the annum or astronomical Julian year (365.25 days of 86,400 seconds), denoted with the symbol a. Its definition is based on the average length of a year according to the Julian calendar, which has one leap year every four years. According to the geological science convention, this is used to form larger units of time by the application of SI prefixes to it; at least up to giga-annum or Ga, equal to 1,000,000,000 a (short scale: one billion years, long scale: one milliard years).

Less than one second

More than one second 

In this table, large intervals of time surpassing one second are catalogued in order of the SI multiples of the second as well as their equivalent in common time units of minutes, hours, days, and Julian years.

See also

References

External links
 Exploring Time from Planck time to the lifespan of the universe

Chronology
Time